The perennial vine Lonicera hispidula is a species of honeysuckle known as pink honeysuckle and, less often, California honeysuckle.  It is a low-elevation woodlands shrub or vine found on the West Coast of North America.

Description
Like other honeysuckles, Lonicera hispidula has pairs of leaves that grow opposite each other on the stem, with the uppermost pair fused at the bases to surround the stem. At the end of the stem grow pink blossoms. It is a perennial shrub or vine. It bears spherical red fruits which are edible but bitter.

Ecology
Lonicera hispidula grows in riparian and woodland areas. The flowers attract hummingbirds, while other birds eat the fruits.

Human uses
The stems are hollow and sturdy and were used by the Pomo people as smoking pipes. It is cultivated by specialty native plant plant nurseries as an ornamental plant for drought-tolerant wildlife gardens and natural landscaping in California.

Taxonomy
Currently no subspecies are recognized. Previously recognized subspecies include Lonicera hispidula var. californica (Torr. & A. Gray) Rehder, Lonicera hispidula var. hispidula, and Lonicera hispidula var. vacillans A. Gray.

References

External links

Jepson Manual Treatment - Lonicera hispidula
UW Herbarium Profile
Ethnobotany

hispidula
Flora of California
Flora of Oregon
Flora of Washington (state)
Flora of the Klamath Mountains
Flora of the Sierra Nevada (United States)
Natural history of the California chaparral and woodlands
Natural history of the California Coast Ranges
Natural history of the Channel Islands of California
Natural history of the Peninsular Ranges
Natural history of the San Francisco Bay Area
Natural history of the Santa Monica Mountains
Natural history of the Transverse Ranges
Bird food plants
Garden plants of North America
Vines
Flora without expected TNC conservation status